Summer Block Party is a music concert tour by American R&B/soul artist, Jill Scott. Primarily visiting the United States, the tour supported her fourth studio album, The Light of the Sun.  The tour was hosted by Doug E. Fresh and featured sets by DJ Jazzy Jeff, giving the tour the "block party" vibe. With 18 shows in 2011, the tour was extended with additional dates for a one-month run in June 2012.

Background
The tour was announced on Scott's official website on June 2, 2011. Sponsored by famed concert series "Budweiser Superfest", the outing played amphitheaters in the U.S. during the summer season. On June 17, 2011, fans were given the opportunity to purchase concert tickets and pre-order Scott's album through Live Nation. The success of the 2011 show prompted Scott to add shows during the summer of 2012. Joining the singer on tour are Kem, Salt-n-Pepa and Eric Roberson. Additionally, Scott launched a contest for an opening act for her show in Atlanta.

Opening acts
Anthony Hamilton (2011)
Mint Condition (2011)
Jeff Bradshaw (2012)
Kem (2012)
Salt-n-Pepa (2012—Washington, D.C.)
Eric Roberson (2012—Philadelphia)

Setlist
"Shame"
"Gimme"
"Quick"
"All Cried Out (Redux)"
"Hate on Me"
"The Way"
"So In Love"
"Le BOOM Vent Suite"
"Womanifesto"
"Rolling Hills"
"Slowly Surely"
"It's Love"
"A Long Walk"
"Come See Me"
"Cross My Mind"
"So Gone (What My Mind Says)"
"Crown Royal"
"Golden"
Encore
"He Loves Me (Lyzel In E Flat)"
"Blessed"

Notes
 Scott added performances of "The Real Thing" and "When I Wake Up" as part of her set for the second North America leg 'Summer Block Party' in June 2012.

Tour dates

Box office score data

Festivals and other miscellaneous performances

This concert is a part of the "Hampton Jazz Festival"

External links
Scott's Official Website
DJ Block Party

References

Jill Scott (singer) concert tours
2011 concert tours
2012 concert tours